Pecetto di Valenza is a commune of the Province of Alessandria in the Piedmont region of northwest Italy with a population of 1282 (December 2008 estimate). The commune's neighbours are Alessandria, Bassignana, Montecastello, Pietra Marazzi, and Valenza.

Four distinct settlements are identified in the Statuto comunale as "historically recognised by the community"; these were also the four designated places for the 2001 census. A further 360 residents, 27 percent of the total, were counted in isolated dwellings such as farmhouses.

Notable people
Giuseppe Borsalino, who gave his name to the Borsalino hat-making company which he developed in Alessandria, was born in Pecetto di Valenza in 1834.

References

Cities and towns in Piedmont